The PGM-9-class motor gunboats were a class of 24 gunboats converted for the United States Navy from 1944-1945, succeeding the s.  All 24 PGM-9s were converted from s while still under construction.  The PGM-9s were created to support PT boats in the Pacific, but were too slow to keep up, and were shifted to support minesweeping ships instead.

Gunboats of the United States Navy
 
Gunboat classes